By the arrangements of the Canadian federation, the Canadian monarchy operates in Nova Scotia as the core of the province's Westminster-style parliamentary democracy. As such, the Crown within Nova Scotia's jurisdiction is referred to as the Crown in Right of Nova Scotia, His Majesty in Right of Nova Scotia, or the King in Right of Nova Scotia. The Constitution Act, 1867, however, leaves many royal duties in the province specifically assigned to the sovereign's viceroy, the lieutenant governor of Nova Scotia, whose direct participation in governance is limited by the conventional stipulations of constitutional monarchy.

Constitutional role

The role of the Crown is both legal and practical; it functions in Nova Scotia in the same way it does in all of Canada's other provinces, being the centre of a constitutional construct in which the institutions of government acting under the sovereign's authority share the power of the whole. It is thus the foundation of the executive, legislative, and judicial branches of the province's government. The Canadian monarch—since 8 September 2022, King Charles III—is represented and his duties carried out by the lieutenant governor of Nova Scotia, whose direct participation in governance is limited by the conventional stipulations of constitutional monarchy, with most related powers entrusted for exercise by the elected parliamentarians, the ministers of the Crown generally drawn from among them, and the judges and justices of the peace. The Crown today primarily functions as a guarantor of continuous and stable governance and a nonpartisan safeguard against the abuse of power.

This arrangement began with the 1867 British North America Act and continued an unbroken line of monarchical government extending back to the late 16th century. However, though it has a separate government headed by the King, as a province, Nova Scotia is not itself a kingdom.

Government House in Halifax is owned by the sovereign in his capacity as King in right of Nova Scotia and is used as an official residence, both by the lieutenant governor and the sovereign and other members of the Canadian royal family will reside there when in Nova Scotia.

Royal associations

Those in the royal family perform ceremonial duties when on a tour of the province; the royal persons do not receive any personal income for their service, only the costs associated with the exercise of these obligations are funded by both the Canadian and Nova Scotia Crowns in their respective councils. Monuments around Nova Scotia mark some of those visits, while others honour a royal personage or event. Further, Nova Scotia's monarchical status is illustrated by royal names applied regions, communities, schools, and buildings, many of which may also have a specific history with a member or members of the royal family. Associations also exist between the Crown and many private organizations within the province; these may have been founded by a royal charter, received a royal prefix, and/or been honoured with the patronage of a member of the royal family. Examples include the Royal Nova Scotia International Tattoo, which was under the patronage of Queen Elizabeth II and received its royal prefix from her in 2006.

The main symbol of the monarchy is the sovereign himself, his image (in portrait or effigy) thus being used to signify government authority. A royal cypher or crown may also illustrate the monarchy as the locus of authority, without referring to any specific monarch. Further, though the monarch does not form a part of the constitutions of Nova Scotia's honours, they do stem from the Crown as the fount of honour and, so, bear on the insignia symbols of the sovereign.

History

The first colonies
The roots of the present Crown in Nova Scotia lie in Jacques Cartier's claim, in 1534, of Chaleur Bay for King Francis I; though, the area was not officially settled until King Henry IV established a colony there in 1604, administered by the governor of Acadia in the capital of Port-Royal, so named for the King. Only slightly later, King James VI and I laid claim to areas overlapping with Acadia, in what is today Nova Scotia, New Brunswick, and part of Maine, and brought it within the Scottish Crown's dominion, calling the region Nova Scotia (or "new Scotland"). James' son, Charles I, issued the Charter of New Scotland, which created the baronets of Nova Scotia, many of which continue to exist today.

Over the course of the 17th century, the French Crown lost, via war and treaties, its Maritimes territories to the British sovereign, Acadia being gradually taken until it fully became British territory through the Treaty of Paris in 1763 and the name Nova Scotia was applied to the whole region. But, this placement of French people under a British sovereign did not transpire without problems; French colonialists in Acadia were asked by British officials, uneasy about where the Acadians' loyalties lay, to reaffirm their allegiance to King George III. The Acadians refused, not as any slight to the King, but, more to remain Catholic, and were subsequently deported from the area in what became known as the Great Upheaval.

The arrival of United Empire Loyalists
During and following the American Revolution, some 35,000 to 40,000 United Empire Loyalists, as well as about 3,500 Black Loyalists, fled from the Thirteen Colonies and then the United States to Nova Scotia, refugees from the violence directed against them during the war. So many arrived that New Brunswick was split out of Nova Scotia as a separate colony.

Not all who settled in the colony were immediately made to feel comfortable, however, as many of the already resident families were aligned with the United States and its republican cause; Colonel Thomas Dundas wrote from Saint John in 1786, "[the Loyalists] have experienced every possible injury from the old inhabitants of Nova Scotia, who are even more disaffected towards the British government than any of the new states ever were. This makes me much doubt their remaining long dependent."

Prince William Henry (later King William IV) arrived at the Royal Naval Dockyards in Halifax in late 1786, on board his firgate, . Although he received a royal reception, it was later made clear the Prince would be granted no further special treatment other than already accorded to an officer of the his rank in the Royal Navy.

The residence of Prince Edward

A son of King George III, Prince Edward, was sent in 1794 to take command of Nova Scotia, living at the headquarters of the Royal Navy's North American Station in Halifax; though, Lieutenant Governor Sir John Wentworth and Lady Francis Wentworth provided their country residence for the use of Prince Edward and his French-Canadian mistress, Julie St. Laurent, where they hosted various dignitaries, including Louis-Phillippe of Orléans (the future Louis Philippe I, King of the French). Edward extensively renovated the estate, including designing and overseeing the construction of Prince's Lodge (or the Music Room). He also oversaw the reconstruction of Fort George and designed and had built the Halifax Town Clock and St George's Church (also known as the Round Church). The King and Edward's brother, Prince Frederick, were highly supportive of the latter project, the King providing a £200 donation. Aditionally, Edward prompted the construction of numerous roads, made improvements to the Grand Parade, and devised a telegraph system.

After falling from his horse in late 1798, the Prince returned to the United Kingdom, where his father created him Duke of Kent and Strathearn and appointed Commander-in-Chief of British forces in North America. He voyaged back to Nova Scotia in mid-1799 and remained there for another year, before sailing back, once more, to Britain.

The 20th century
For the bicentennial in 1983 of the arrival of the first Empire Loyalists in Nova Scotia,  Charles, Prince of Wales, and his wife, Diana, Princess of Wales, attended the celebrations.

In 2022, Nova Scotia instituted a provincial Platinum Jubilee medal to mark the Elizabeth II's seventy years on the Canadian throne; the first time in Canada's history that a royal occasion was commemorated on provincial medals.

See also
 Symbols of Nova Scotia
 Monarchy

Notes

References

Nova Scotia, Monarchy in